The Siemens torpedo glider (often referred to as an aerial torpedo) was an early precursor of the modern glide bomb developed in World War I but never used in action. It consisted of a naval torpedo with an attached airframe which was to be remotely wire-guided.

History
In October 1914, Dr. Wilhelm von Siemens proposed what became was to become known as the Siemens torpedo glider, a wire-guided flying missile that would have comprised a naval torpedo with an attached airframe. It was not intended that it be flown into a target; rather, at a suitable altitude and position, a signal would have been transmitted which would cause the airframe components to detach from the torpedo which would then enter the water and continue towards its target. Guidance signals were to be transmitted through a thin copper wire unrolled from a  reel above the fuselage, and guide flares were to be carried to help control.

Siemens-Schuckertwerke was already occupied with remote-controlled anti-shipping motorboats (the FL-boats or Fernlenkboote), and so had some experience in the field of remote control.

Flight testing was performed under the supervision of Dipl. Ing. Dorner from January 1915 onwards, using airships as carriers. Different types of biplane and monoplane airframes were tested, to which a torpedo was fitted, before a biplane layout was adopted due to its greater carrying ability. The last test flight was performed on August 2, 1918. On this flight a  biplane glider was launched from Zeppelin LZ 80 (L 35).

It was planned to use the Siemens-Schuckert R.VIII bomber as a carrier craft, but the Armistice stopped the project.

See also
Kettering Bug

Bibliography 
Notes

References 
 - Total pages: 256 
 - Total pages: 320
  

	

Torpedoes of Germany
Siemens torpedo glider